Harbaksh Stadium is a sports stadium in Delhi Cantonment, New Delhi Delhi, India, which hosts cricket matches, including part of the 1997 Women's Cricket World Cup.

See also

Delhi
List of Test cricket grounds
List of stadiums in India
Sport in India

References

External links

Cricket grounds in Delhi
Sports venues in Delhi
Buildings and structures in New Delhi
Year of establishment missing